Traditional foods are foods and dishes that are passed on through generations or which have been consumed for many generations. Traditional foods and dishes are traditional in nature, and may have a historic precedent in a national dish, regional cuisine or local cuisine. Traditional foods and beverages may be produced as homemade, by restaurants and small manufacturers, and by large food processing plant facilities.

Some traditional foods have geographical indications and traditional specialties in the European Union designations per European Union schemes of geographical indications and traditional specialties: Protected designation of origin (PDO), Protected geographical indication (PGI) and Traditional specialties guaranteed (TSG). These standards serve to promote and protect names of quality agricultural products and foodstuffs.

This article also includes information about traditional beverages.

Difference between traditional and typical 
Although it is common for them to be used as synonyms, the truth is that "traditional" cuisine and "typical" cuisine are considered two different concepts according to culinary anthropology; The first refers to culinary customs that are invariably inherited orally, on a small scale in the family, and a large scale in a community as part of its culture and identity. On the other hand, when we speak of typical (or "popular") cuisine, it is one that most people in a place like and is massively replicated. Therefore, a traditional dish may be typical and vice versa, but neither much less all the typical dishes are traditional nor the traditional ones are typical.

Most traditional dishes are originated from the skill of housewives who creatively and sensibly combined the techniques and ingredients they had on hand to create new recipes. If people like that recipe, it becomes worthy of being imitated. In other words, it is spread and replicated so many times that it becomes a classic recipe. For this reason, the culinary tradition is made up of a vast variety of classic recipes, which are necessarily linked to a land of origin, specific products, and specific local habits. There are classic recipes that can fall into oblivion and disappear forever, but if they are consumed massively, they become part of the typical cuisine of a place. The Mexican culinary anthropologist Maru Toledo adds a third concept to this process, which is that of "typical commercial" cuisine, something that did not exist until the commercialization of cuisine (a process that has occurred very recently, if we observe the complete chronology of food history).

Commercialized cuisine 
The commercialized cuisine appropriates the characteristics of the traditional (even the same adjective "traditional", on numerous occasions) but the aim is none other than economic profit. For this reason, it does not want to delve into the origin, nor in the context, much less the diversity around the dishes, it sells. Finally, the mainstream population, generally without much culinary knowledge, believe that the food they are buying is their own, thus happening a kind of food acculturation and simplifying the diversity of products, techniques, recipes and other culinary aspects of the tradition.

By continent

Africa

 Bambara groundnut – a traditional food crop in Africa

Europe
Traditional food products have been described as playing "an important part of European culture, identity, and heritage".

South America

 Humita – a traditional food in Bolivia, Chile, Ecuador, and Peru

By country

Canada

 Country food refers to the traditional diets of Aboriginal people (known in Canada as First Nations, Metis, and Inuit), especially in remote northern regions where Western food is an expensive import, and traditional foods are still relied upon.
 Thanksgiving dinner

Québec

 Poutine 
 Tourtière
 Sucre à la crème
 Pâté chinois
 Pouding chômeur
 St. Catherine's taffy
 Spruce beer
 Maple syrup
 Cretons

Acadia

 Poutine râpée
 Fricot

China

 Ciba cake
 Dim sum
 Fuling jiabing – a traditional snack food of Beijing and an integral part of the city's culture. It is a pancake-like snack made from flour, sugar, and fuling (Poria), rolled around nuts, honey, and other ingredients.
 Spring pancake – a traditional Chinese food unique to the northern regions. People eat spring pancakes on the day called lichun to celebrate the beginning of spring.
 Zhongzi - sticky rice with savory or sweet ingredients wrapped in bamboo leaves and boiled. Made to commemorate the poet and minister Qu Yuan during the Dragon boat festival.

Costa Rica
 Rice and beans

Croatia
 Lecsó

Cyprus
 Tsamarella – a traditional food and one of Cyprus' main lunch meats

Czech Republic
 Lecsó
 Svíčková

Estonia
 Mulgipuder
 Sepik

Eswatini

Faroe Islands

 Faroese puffin
 Garnatálg
 Skerpikjøt
 Whale meat

Finland

 Karelian stew
 Karelian pasty
 Kesäkeitto
 Sautéed reindeer
 Ruisreikäleipä
 Ryynimakkara
 Mustamakkara
 Kalakukko
 Lörtsy
 Rönttönen
 Sultsina
 Mämmi

France
 Appellation d'origine contrôlée – the French certification granted to certain French geographical indications for wines, cheeses, butters, and other agricultural products
 Bresse chicken – a French chicken product with appellation d'origine contrôlée status
 List of Appellation d'Origine Contrôlée liqueurs and spirits
 List of Appellation d'Origine Contrôlée wines

Germany
 Black Forest ham – produced in the Black Forest region of Germany, it is a Protected Designation of Origin (PDO) food in the European Union.

Guatemala

 Fiambre is a traditional Guatemalan dish that is prepared and eaten yearly to celebrate the Day of the Dead (Día de Los Muertos) and the All Saints Day (Día de Todos Los Santos).

Iceland
 Hákarl – a traditional food and national dish of Iceland
 Hangikjöt
 Þorramatur – a selection of traditional Icelandic food, consisting mainly of meat and fish products cured in a traditional manner, cut into slices or pieces and served with rúgbrauð (dense and dark rye bread), butter and brennivín (an Icelandic akvavit)

India

dal chawal
Kheer
Roti
sabzi

Indonesia

 Brem – a fermented snack and beverage from Java and Bali
 Docang – a traditional food from Cirebon
 Gado-gado – a traditional salad in peanut sauce dressing
 Gudeg – a young unripe jackfruit stew, a traditional food from Yogyakarta 
 Ketupat – a traditional rice dumpling commonly served during Lebaran, Indonesian idul fitri
 Kuluban – an ancient Javanese traditional salad
 Lawar – a traditional Balinese vegetable dish
 Opor ayam – chicken in coconut milk stew, a traditional dish commonly consumed with ketupat during Lebaran
 Pallubasa – a traditional food from Makassar, South Sulawesi made from offal of cattle or buffalo
 Papeda – sago congee, a traditional staple of Eastern Indonesia (Maluku and Papua)
 Rendang – traditional Minangkabau dish from West Sumatra
 Satay – grilled meat on skewers, various traditional regional variants exist in Indonesia
 Soto – a category of traditional soup of Indonesia, numerous regional variations exist
 Tempeh – fermented soy cake, traditional food from Java
 Tumpeng – a ceremonial rice cone surrounded by various side dishes, an Indonesian national dish

Iran
 Chelow kabab
 Tahdig
 Ghormeh sabzi
 Fesenjān
 Sabzi polo
 Abgoosht
 Gheimeh
 Sholezard
 Āsh
 Mirza Ghassemi
 Nargesi
 Baghala ghatogh

Ireland
 Full breakfast
 Sunday roast

Italy

 Pasta
 Pizza
 Prosciutto (PDO)
 Ravioli
 Salami
 Spaghetti

By designation of origin
 Denominazione di origine controllata – a quality assurance label for Italian food products, especially Italian wine and cheese
 List of Italian DOC wines
 List of Italian DOCG wines
 Indicazione geografica tipica
 Prodotto agroalimentare tradizionale is an official approval for traditional Italian regional food products similar to the Protected Geographical Status of the European Union.
 Mascarpone
 Piadina
 Strada dell'Olio – a kind of gastronomical route in Italy that crosses a territory rich of traditional products, PDOs and PGIs, DOCs and DOCGs in Italy.

Piedmont
 Panna cotta – The northern Italian Region of Piedmont includes panna cotta in its 2001 list of traditional food products of the region. Panna cotta is not mentioned in Italian cookbooks before the 1960s, yet it is often cited as a traditional dessert in Piedmont.

Japan

 Mochi – eaten year-round in Japan, mochi is a traditional food for the Japanese New Year and is commonly sold and eaten during that time

Jordan
Traditional beverages in Jordan include sous (also referred to as 'irqsus), a drink prepared using the dried root of Glycyrrhiza glabra (liquorice), tamr hindi, a drink prepared from an infusion of the dried pulp of Tamarindus indica (tamarind), and laban (labneh), a drink prepared with yogurt and water. A significant amount of labneh in Jordan and nearby countries continues to be prepared using the traditional method of "straining set yogurt in cloth bags".

Korea

 Bibimbap
 Bulgogi
 Ganjang Gyejang
 Kimchi
 Nurungji
 San Nakji
 Sickhye
 Sungnyung

Latvia

 Grey peas
 Layered rye bread
 Sklandrausis
 Speķrauši

Lithuania
 Cepelinai

Maldives

 Garudiya 
 Maldive fish – cured tuna fish traditionally produced in the Maldives. It is a staple food in Maldivian cuisine

Malta
 Lent in Malta § Traditional food eaten throughout the period
Kwareżimal – Lent cake

Mexico

 Atole
 Capirotada – usually eaten during the Lenten period (comida de cuaresma). It is one of the dishes served on Good Friday.
 Chiles
 Enchilada
 Iguana meat
 Legumes, beans and refried beans
 Maize
 Tortilla
 Mole sauce
 Pork
 Chorizo
 Rice – traditionally pan fried to a golden color before cooking 
 Rice and beans
 Sope
 Tamale

Nepal
 Dhindo

Portugal
 Denominação de Origem Controlada is the system of protected designation of origin for wines, cheeses, butter, and other agricultural products from Portugal.

Saudi Arabia
 Hininy
 Kabsa

Singapore

 Hainanese chicken rice – considered as a national dish of Singapore
 Teochew porridge

Slovakia
 Bryndzové halušky – a national dish of Slovakia consisting of halušky and bryndza.
 Lecsó

Spain
 Boroña – a cornbread that is a traditional food in the regions of Galicia, Asturias, Cantabria, the Basque Country and northern Castilla-Leon (areas of León, Palencia and Burgos)
 Denominación de Origen – part of a regulatory classification system primarily for Spanish wines (similar to the French appellations) but also for other foodstuffs like cheeses, condiments, honey and meats, among others

Sweden

 Falukorv
 Janssons frestelse
 Pyttipanna

Switzerland
 Appellation d'origine protégée – A Swiss geographical indication protecting the origin and the quality of traditional food products other than wines 
 Capuns – a traditional food from the canton of Graubünden in Switzerland

Tanzania
 Pare people § Traditional food

Thailand
 Mango sticky rice
 Pad Thai

Turkey
 İmam bayıldı

Uganda
 Malewa – smoked bamboo shoot which is dried for preservation. The food originated from Eastern Uganda in the Bugisu sub-region

United Kingdom

England

 Bangers and mash
 Cottage pie
 Faggot
 Fish and chips 
 Full breakfast
 Sunday roast

Wales
 Cawl
 Welsh cakes
 Glamorgan sausages
 Laverbread 
 Welsh rarebit 
 Bara brith

Scotland

 Haggis
 Lorne sausage
 Neeps and tatties 
 Cullen skink
 Arbroath smokies
 Reestit mutton

United States

 Cardamom bread – considered as a traditional food among Swedish Americans
 Thanksgiving dinner

Southern United States

 Biscuit
 Cheese straw
 Cornbread
 Collard greens
 Hoppin' John
 Sweet potato

Vanuatu

 Laplap – a national dish

Yemen
 Kabsa

By region

Arab states of the Persian Gulf
 Khabees – traditional sweet dish in the Arab states of the Persian Gulf

Commonwealth Caribbean
 Rice and peas – a traditional dish in the Anglo-Caribbean

Levant (Eastern Mediterranean)
Traditional foods of the Levant include falafel, fuul, halawa, hummus, kanafeh, labaneh, medammis and tahini. among others. The most popular traditional foods in the region are those prepared from legumes, specifically, falafel, fuul, hummus and medammis.

European Union
 Geographical indications and traditional specialties in the European Union
 Quality Wines Produced in Specified Regions – a quality indicator used within European Union wine regulations that identifies wines with protected geographical indications
 List of geographical designations for spirit drinks in the European Union

Scandinavia
 European crayfish
 Crayfish party

Southern Africa
 Soured milk – traditional food of the Bantu peoples of Southern Africa

See also

 Christmas dinner
 Appellation
 Shrove Tuesday – known in some countries as Pancake Tuesday or Pancake day
 Whole food

Notes

References

Further reading
 
 
 
 

Cuisine